The following is a list of the 772 communes of the Somme department of France.

The communes cooperate in the following intercommunalities (as of 2020):
Communauté d'agglomération Amiens Métropole
Communauté d'agglomération de la Baie de Somme
Communauté de communes interrégionale Aumale - Blangy-sur-Bresle (partly)
Communauté de communes Avre Luce Noye
Communauté de communes de l'Est de la Somme (partly)
Communauté de communes du Grand Roye
Communauté de communes de la Haute Somme
Communauté de communes Nièvre et Somme
Communauté de communes du Pays du Coquelicot
Communauté de communes Ponthieu-Marquenterre
Communauté de communes Somme Sud-Ouest
Communauté de communes du Ternois (partly)
Communauté de communes Terre de Picardie
Communauté de communes du Territoire Nord Picardie
Communauté de communes du Val de Somme
Communauté de communes des Villes Sœurs (partly) 
Communauté de communes du Vimeu

References

Somme